The 2009 L&H 500 was the Race 17 of the 2009 V8 Supercar Championship Series. It was held on the weekend of 11 to 13 September at the Phillip Island Grand Prix Circuit in Victoria, Australia. This was the ninth running of the Phillip Island 500 and the second time that Phillip Island had served as the venue for the annual 500 kilometre two-driver V8 Supercar endurance race. Unique to this event, two preliminary 14 lap Qualifying Races were held on Saturday with the two drivers of each car starting one race each. A single pitstop by each car in either race was mandated with the combined results of the two races determining the grid for the main 500 kilometre race. The three races all carried championship points and together constituted "Race 17" of the championship. However the finishing positions at the end of the 500 km race were deemed to be the finishing positions of the "2009 L&H 500" regardless of the total points scored by drivers over the three individual races.

For the first time since 2004, teams from outside of the V8 Supercar Championship Series were invited to compete in a championship race. Consequently, three single-car teams from the 2009 Fujitsu V8 Supercar Series contested the L&H500, bringing the total entry up to 32 cars.

Qualifying 
Qualifying was held on Saturday 12 September 2009. Driver A Qualifying was interrupted by a red flag after Greg Ritter spun his Garry Rogers Motorsport Commodore in a sensitive position at turn 3 in the middle of the session which upset session plans for many teams. Paul Dumbrell set a time early in the session before the red which ended up standing for the session, taking pole position in his first drive for the Holden Racing Team. Todd Kelly worked down to his time, just one hundredth of a second behind Dumbrell. Will Davison and Steven Johnson also set their best laps early in the session to fill the second row of the grid. Warren Luff ably backed up teammate Johnson to be the fastest of the non-full-time V8 Supercar drivers in fifth position alongside the Ford of Steven Richards. David Reynolds was seventh fastest, a career best, ahead of Craig Lowndes with Dean Canto and Cameron McConville completing the tenth fastest drivers. Of the remaining positions the full-time drivers were generally faster. The best of the three wild card entries was Brad Lowe in 27th while at the tail Andrew Fisher was eighth tenths slower than Leanne Tander. Dean Fiore was excluded from qualifying and started the Driver A race from pit lane.

Mark Winterbottom recorded the fastest lap of either session to take Driver B pole position ahead of Fabian Coulthard and Rick Kelly, both of whom were faster than Dumbrell's Driver A pole position. James Courtney, Jason Richards, Jason Bright, Jamie Whincup, Garth Tander, Alex Davison and Jonathon Webb completed the top ten. Webb, matching his co-driver Luff to be the fastest part-time V8 racer. Andrew Thompson was impressive in eleventh. Damian Assaillit was the fastest wildcard driver in 25th, just behind triple touring car world champion Andy Priaulx. The other triple world champ, Superbike's Troy Bayliss was last, the slowest driver of the day and a full second slower than Tony Ricciardello who was 31st in the Driver B session.

Driver A Race 
Poor start by both Dick Johnson Racing Falcons, but particularly Steven Johnson made a mess of the start. Todd Kelly took the early lead from Paul Dumbrell and Will Davison. Craig Lowndes forced past Steven Richards into fourth position with David Reynolds and Dean Canto in close company. Dumbrell lost two spots in the next few laps as Lowndes charged through the field.

Karl Reindler was spun by Paul Morris on the opening lap while Brad Lowe pitted with a steering problem. Jason Richards, Steven Johnson and Michael Patrizi pitted early in the race getting the compulsory stop for either race out of the way. For Johnson after dropping 20 positions at the start, he had nothing to lose by pitting.

Kelly and Lowndes raced clear of the field to take the top two positions. Davison was third ahead of Shane van Gisbergen who climbed through the field from outside the top ten to finish fourth. Russell Ingall climbed into fifth while Dumbrell faded to sixth. Reynolds was seventh ahead of Canto, Steve Owen and Dane Allan Simonsen.

Steven Richards and Cameron McConville were the best finishing drivers who made pitstops, finishing 15th and 16th. Johnson recovered to 19th. Lowe finished four laps down, but did finish with all cars making the finish. Morris was subsequently disqualified for his contact with Reindler.

Driver B Race 
The first race was held on Saturday 12 September 2009. Jason Richards stalled on the grid, but got going again, Warren Luff was also slow away. Mark Winterbottom led Fabian Coulthard, Rick Kelly, Garth Tander, James Courtney, Jason Bright and Jamie Whincup.

Tony Ricciardello speared off and beached his Commodore at the final turn of the opening lap and Nathan Pretty pitted with damage and retired without completing a lap. A safety car was called to retrieve Ricciardello. Greg Murphy spun at the restart at Siberia after contact with Jason Bargwanna. Tander and Alex Davison were the first to stop. The Stone Brothers Racing team serviced their car faster, but not by enough, and the pair made contact in pitlane.

A broken ballast bracket on Rick Kelly's car broke loose, dragging underneath the car. A black flag was prepared for Kelly and he pitted immediately for repairs.

Winterbottom dominated the race, and combined with Steven Richards result from the Driver A race secured pole position for the 500 kilometre race on Sunday. Fabian Coulthard's second position was a career best with Jason Bright finishing third. James Courtney was fourth ahead of David Besnard (best part-time racer), Jason Bargwanna, Andrew Thompson, John McIntyre, Jonathon Webb with Jason Richards completing the top ten race positions. Jamie Whincup was the best of the pitstop drivers in 19th position, a result good enough the secure the other front row starting position.

500km Race
The 500 km race was held on Sunday 13 September 2009. Dean Fiore broke an alternator, depriving Troy Bayliss of his first V8 Supercar race start. Whincup won the start with Will Davison forcing past Steven Richards into second position. Alex Davison and Coulthard followed. Youlden was slowing early with bodywork rubbing a tyre after contact in the left rear corner. Coulthard had a mechanical failure in the engine bay causing a fire under the bonnet. Several cars following slid off track from spilt oil. Lap 11 contact between Karl Reindler and Dale Wood made contact and spin off track at turn 1.

Steven Richards started losing race positions dropping back to fifth as David Besnard charged through the field in the Garry Rogers Motorsport Commodore, climb to fourth behind the Davison brothers. Greg Murphy pitted early, putting Mark Skaife back into racing in second last position. Alex Davison had a wheel failure due to a loose nut on the front right wheel which has cut the wheel in half causing him to spear off at Lukey Heights whilst defending third from Besnard.

Coming down the front straight Steve Owen and Cameron McConville made contact, breaking the steering on McConville's car who then speared straight off the track at turn 1 at high speed and eventually crossed the track again between turns two and three, almost hitting Besnard. Immediately afterwards on camera McConville blamed Owen for blocking several times on the straight.

Under the ensuing safety car approximately 20 cars pitted. After the restart Lowndes and Tander having taken over their cars charged into the race lead, quickly cutting through the slower cars that had worked through to the front of the safety car queue. Further back as the field sorted itself out Lee Holdsworth left the track at turn two after contact with Allan Simonsen. Simonsen received a drive-through penalty.

On lap 32 Holdsworth with damaged to the front left corner speared off at turn one after contact on the front straight with Brad Jones. Holdsworth pulled the car up short of crossing the track again and the car limped back to the pits. Jones suffered a puncture in the right rear.

Whincup now led from Will Davison, Johnson and Rick Kelly. Lap 48 saw a power steering failure in Jason Bargwanna's Commodore. Lap 52 saw Johnson pit from third and change to Courtney. A lap later Whincup and Will Davison pitted from first and second with Lowndes rejoining ahead of Tander. Tander immediately closed the gap. Bright became the third car to have a big lose at turn one, this one from brake failure. The front right tyre then punctured.

On lap 66 Todd Kelly slowed dramatically. Brad Jones finally retired. As the race approached lap 80 Lowndes had built a small gap over Tander with Winterbottom climbing into the podium positions as Courtney lost ground. Tander pitted on lap 82. Lowndes on lap 83, rejoining still ahead of Tander. Winterbottom pitted on lap 84 from the inherited lead. Courtney pitted on lap 85 again from the lead, handing the lead to Todd Kelly. Lap 88 saw Craig Lowndes leave the circuit at turn 2, causing him to lose the lead to Tander. Ten laps later Lowndes took the lead back on the run towards turn three after the pair had a small moment at turn two.

Lowndes found front right tyre was delaminating with three laps to go. Gradually the car slowed but Tander was able to pounce halfway around the final lap to take the win. Lowndes hung on for second position ahead of Mark Winterbottom and James Courtney. The Kelly brothers finished in fifth position ahead of the best of the part-time combinations, Warren Luff and Jonathon Webb. Russell Ingall and Tim Slade, Craig Baird and Paul Dumbrell, Dean Canto and Luke Youlden and Alex Davison and Shane van Gisbergen completed the top ten race finishers.

Results

Driver A Qualifying
Qualifying timesheet:

Driver B Qualifying
Qualifying timesheet:

Driver A Race results
Race timesheet:

Driver B Race results
Race timesheet:

500km race results

References

External links
Official series website
Official timing and results at www.natsoft.com.au
Images from the 2009 L&H 500 at www.motorsport.com

L and H 500
Motorsport at Phillip Island
Phillip Island 500
Pre-Bathurst 500
September 2009 sports events in Australia